San Jose and Ocean station is a light rail stop on the Muni Metro J Church line, located in the Mission Terrace neighborhood of San Francisco, California adjacent to the Balboa Park neighborhood and the Balboa Park station complex. The station has two side platforms in the middle of San Jose Avenue (traffic islands) located before the intersection in each direction where passengers board or depart from trains. The station is not accessible to people with disabilities.

History 

J Church and N Judah trains began using the extension of the line along San Jose Avenue for carhouse moves on August 31, 1991. Although these trips were open to passengers, the extension and its stops did not open for full-time service until June 19, 1993. K Ingleside trains formerly stopped inside the yard loop at San Jose and Ocean. The stop was discontinued on April 25, 2015, due to the opening of the new accessible boarding platform at Balboa Park two days later.

In March 2014, Muni released details of the proposed implementation of their Transit Effectiveness Project (later rebranded MuniForward), which included a variety of stop changes for the J Church line. No changes were proposed for San Jose and Ocean.

References

External links 

SFMTA – San Jose Ave and Ocean Ave inbound and outbound
SFBay Transit (unofficial) – San Jose Ave & Ocean Ave

Muni Metro stations
Railway stations in the United States opened in 1991